Nurabad (also Romanized as Nūrābād) is a village in Ashna Khvor Rural District, in the Central District of Khomeyn County, Markazi Province, Iran. At the 2006 census, its population was 167, in 44 families.

References 

Populated places in Khomeyn County